Bernd Joachim Uhl (23 November 1946 – 22 January 2023) was a German Roman Catholic prelate.

Uhl was born in Germany and was ordained to the priesthood in 1974. He served as titular bishop of Malliana and as auxiliary bishop of the Roman Catholic Archdiocese of Freiburg, Germany from 2001 until his resignation in 2018.

References

1946 births
2023 deaths
German Roman Catholic titular bishops
21st-century German Roman Catholic bishops
21st-century Roman Catholic bishops in Germany
Bishops appointed by Pope John Paul II
University of Freiburg alumni
Heidelberg University alumni
Clergy from Freiburg im Breisgau